Cocco Bill is an animated television series that aired from 2000 to 2004. It is produced by De Mas & Partners, Rai Fiction, EM.TV & Merchandising AG for the first season, and Agogo Media for the second season. It was inspired by the Coco Bill comic book character created by Benito Jacovitti. Two series were produced for a total of 104 episodes, each lasting for 13 minutes.

Plot

Italian voices actors
Enrico Maggi: Cocco Bill
Raffaele Fallica: Trottalemme 
Silvana Fantini: Osusanna Iloveyou 
Guido Ruberto: Bunz Barabunz   
Claudio Moneta: the Clown, Every Mad and various voices
Antonio Paiola: Mr. Godkiller
Gianni Quillico: Bob La Mossa
Mario Scarabelli: Doctor and various voices
Marco Balzarotti: Biss Kroma and various voices
Luca Bottale: Various voices

English voice actors
 Gregory Snegoff: Cocco Bill and Trottalemme
 Susan Spafford: Osusanna Iloveyou
 Ted Rusoff: Bunz Barabunz

Episodes

Season 1 (2000–2001)

 Cocco Augh! (10 December 2000)
 Cocco Gets It Right (17 December 2000)
 One Cocco, Two Pistols, and a Crib (24 December 2000)
 Cocco and the Guardian Angel (31 December 2000)
 Cocco Cocco Cocco Bill (7 January 2001)
 Cocco Bill on Track (14 January 2001)
 Cocco Lucks It Out (21 January 2001)
 Cocco Bill Against All (28 January 2001)
 Coccobilliput (4 February 2001)
 Cocco Bill Pirate (11 February 2001)
 Coccobusy (18 February 2001)
 Coccobillchamill (25 February 2001)
 Cocco Bill Deceives Them All (4 March 2001)
 Cocco Nice, Bad, Ugly (11 March 2001)
 Cocco Seven (18 March 2001)
 Double Cocco (25 March 2001)
 Cocco Bill and the Ghosts (1 April 2001)
 Cocco Bill and the Shrink (8 April 2001)
 Cocco Bill Loses His Shadow (15 April 2001)
 Coccochristmas (22 April 2001)
 Cocco Bill Queen Puma (29 April 2001)
 Cocco Bill Catastrophe (6 May 2001)
 Cocco Bill Treasure (13 May 2001)
 Coccocrazy (20 May 2001)
 Sheriff Cocco Bill (27 May 2001)
 Cocco Bill in Babylon City (3 June 2001)
 Viva Cocco Bill (10 June 2001)
 Cocco Bill and Daddy's Pet (17 June 2001)
 Cocco Bill Crossing (24 June 2001)
 Cocco UFO (1 July 2001)
 Cocco Bill Returns to the Future (8 July 2001)
 Cocco Bill and the Laughing Dead (15 July 2001)
 Cocco Bill in the Mines (22 July 2001)
 Cocco Bill and the Vanishing Wagons (29 July 2001)
 Cocco Bill and the Ace Up His Sleeve (5 August 2001)
 Cocco Bill Jurassic (12 August 2001)
 Cocco Bill and the Son of Moby Dick (19 August 2001)
 Cocco Boom! (26 August 2001)
 Cocco Bill and Frankenstein's Brother (2 September 2001)
 Cocco Bill and His Soul Mate (9 September 2001)
 Cocco Bill and the Chamonesia (16 September 2001)
 Cocco Bill and the Lake Monster (23 September 2001)
 Cocco Bill and the Rigged Rewards (30 September 2001)
 Cocco Thriller: The Defense's Turn (7 October 2001)
 Cocco Bill and the Great Race (14 October 2001)
 Cocco Bill Dances with Bears (21 October 2001)
 Cocco Bill at Fort Apache (28 October 2001)
 Cocco Bill and the Vampire (4 November 2001)
 Cocco Bill and the Clown (11 November 2001)
 This Crazy, Crazy, Crazy Cocco (18 November 2001)
 Cocco Bill and the Big Bad Wolf (25 November 2001)
 Cocco Bill and the Haunted Castle (2 December 2001)

Season 2 (2004)

 Cocco and the Little Menace (2004)
 Cocco Cookies (2004)
 Cocco Hood (2004)
 Cocco Spot (2004)
 Camp Cocco (2004)
 Cocco and the Phantom of the Opera (2004)
 Cocco and the Lovable Old Lady (2004)
 Cocco Fast Hands (2004)
 Cocco Spy (2004)
 Phewy Cocco Bill (2004)
 Cocco and the Invisible Bunz (2004)
 Cocco Lilliput (2004)
 Cocco Bill Versus Cocco Bill (2004)
 Cocco Bill Says Yo (2004)
 Cocco and the Little Wizard (2004)
 Cocco Zelig (2004)
 Cocco Takes on El Ratto (2004)
 Sizzlin' Sixguns Cocco Bill (2004)
 Croco Cocco (2004)
 Cocco Bill and Lady Bunz (2004)
 Cocco and the Window on the West (2004)
 Cocco Bill and the Diamond Chicks (2004)
 Cocco Bill and the Fugitive (2004)
 Rocky Cocco (2004)
 Cocco at the Centre of the Earth (2004)
 Tomorrow's Another Cocco Day (2004)
 Cocco Bill and the Indian Mask (2004)
 Cocco Crusoe (2004)
 Slowtrot Superstar (2004)
 Supercocco and Terminator (2004)
 Cocco, the Sword and the Weasel (2004)
 Cocco Sting (2004)
 An Ass Named Cocco (2004)
 Cocco Bill and the Doubloons (2004)
 Cocco Bill Takes on the Trio (2004)
 Cocco Bill Chases Shadow (2004)
 Cocco Bill and the Sheik (2004)
 Cocco and the Mummy (2004)
 Dumb Cocco (2004)
 Cocco Bill and the Counterfeiter (2004)
 Cocco and the Rebel Genius (2004)
 Cocco Bill No Good (2004)
 Cocco and the Hoax Dinner (2004)
 Cocco and the Preacher (2004)
 Cocco and the Sleeping Bunzy (2004)
 Cocco and the Works (2004)
 Cocco Against Mandrike (2004)
 Cocco Bill and Mathusalem (2004)
 Cocco Bill Witness Protection (2004)
 Cocco Duel (2004)
 Cocco and the Turkey of the Baskervilles (2004)
 Cocco Bill's Cruise (2004)

See also
List of Italian television series

References 

2001 Italian television series debuts
2000s animated television series
Italian children's animated comedy television series
Television shows based on comics
Western (genre) animated television series